Francis Molo (born 3 September 1994) is a professional rugby league footballer who plays as a  for the St George Illawarra Dragons in the NRL. He has played for both the Cook Islands and Samoa at international level.

He previously played for the Brisbane Broncos and North Queensland Cowboys in the National Rugby League.

Background
Molo was born in Auckland, New Zealand, and moved to Australia, Brisbane when he was 10 months old. He is of Samoan and Cook Island descent. He is the older brother of Michael Molo and cousins with Anthony Milford.

He played his junior football for the Aspley Devils and attended Wavell State High School, before being signed by the Brisbane Broncos.

Playing career

Early career
In 2010, Molo played for the Norths Devils' Cyril Connell Cup side and played for the Queensland under-16s team. In 2011, he moved up to the Devils' Mal Meninga Cup side and was selected to play for the Queensland under-18s team. 

From 2012 to 2014, Molo played for the Brisbane Broncos' NYC team. 

In 2012, he once again represented the Queensland under-18s team. On 20 April 2013, he played for the Queensland under-20s team against the New South Wales under-20s team.

2014
In Round 11 of the 2014 NRL season, Molo made his NRL debut for the Brisbane Broncos against the Wests Tigers. In May, he again played for the Queensland under-20s team against the New South Wales under-20s team.

2015
On 20 June, while playing for the Broncos' feeder club, the Norths Devils against the Sunshine Coast Falcons in the Intrust Super Cup, Molo was involved in a tackle on opposition player James Ackerman, which resulted in the death of Ackerman on 22 June 2015. He received an eight-week suspension for the tackle by the QRL judiciary. On 17 September, Molo played for the Cook Islands against Tonga for the World Cup qualifier.

2016
On 8 May, Molo started at prop in the Cook Islands 30–20 win over Lebanon. In July, while playing for the Devils, Molo received a three-game suspension for a shoulder charge against the Sunshine Coast Falcons. A brawl broke out following the tackle, with Sunshine Coast players reportedly calling Molo a "killer". Two Sunshine Coast players were also suspended, for attacking Molo. It came after being suspended three weeks earlier for a similar incident.

2017
On 20 July, Molo was released from his contract with the Brisbane club and joined the Townsville Blackhawks mid-season.

On 24 October, Molo signed a one-year deal with the North Queensland Cowboys after training with their first grade squad while playing for the Blackhawks.

2018
In Round 11 of the 2018 NRL season, Molo made his debut for North Queensland in their 20–19 loss to South Sydney. It was his first NRL game in almost three years. On 28 June, he re-signed with the North Queensland club for two more seasons.

Molo played the majority of the 2018 season with the Townsville Blackhawks, registering seven NRL games in his first season with North Queensland.

2019
Molo enjoyed a breakout season in 2019, coming off the bench in all 24 of the Cowboys' games. In Round 13, he scored his first NRL try in North Queensland's 20–22 loss to the Manly-Warringah Sea Eagles. On 18 September, he won the Cowboys' 2019 Coach's Award at the club's presentation night.

On 2 October, Molo was nominated for Dally M Interchange Player of the Year at the 2019 Dally M Awards.

2020
On 31 July, Molo re-signed with the North Queensland club until the end of the 2021 season. In Round 13, he played his 50th NRL game in a 10–30 loss to the Gold Coast Titans.

For the second consecutive season, he played every game for North Queensland , starting 11 of them and scoring three tries.

2021
On 16 March, Molo signed with the St. George Illawarra Dragons on a three-year deal commencing from the 2022 NRL season.

2022
During the Anzac Day Cup which happens every year on Anzac Day. With the rivalry of the St. George Illawarra Dragons and the Sydney Roosters. Molo scored his first try for the  Red V in the 11th Minute with the  Saints winning 14-12 for the First time since 2018. 

Molo played a total of 21 games for the club in the 2022 NRL season which saw them finish 10th on the table and miss the finals.

2023
On 23 February, Molo pleaded guilty to a domestic violence charge. He did not appear in Port Kembla court on the 22 February where he pleaded guilty to one count of stalk/intimidate with intent to cause fear of physical harm. St. George Illawarra released a statement claiming the plea related to an incident at Molo's home on December 17 2022.

Achievements and accolades

Individual
North Queensland Cowboys Coach's Award: 2019

Statistics

NRL
 Statistics are correct to the end of the 2020 season

International

References

External links

North Queensland Cowboys profile
NRL profile

1994 births
Living people
Brisbane Broncos players
Cook Islands national rugby league team players
New Zealand emigrants to Australia
New Zealand sportspeople of Cook Island descent
New Zealand sportspeople of Samoan descent
New Zealand rugby league players
North Queensland Cowboys players
Norths Devils players
Rugby league players from Auckland
Rugby league props
Queensland Rugby League State of Origin players
Samoa national rugby league team players
St. George Illawarra Dragons players